Trisha Rae Stahl (born August 10, 1973) is an American actress.

Personal life
Stahl is originally from Williamsport, Pennsylvania. She holds a degree in theatrical performance from Indiana University of Pennsylvania and a Master of Arts in teaching special education.

Career
Her feature films include Trailer Park of Terror and Kiss the Abyss. Ms. Stahl has also had roles on television (ER, "Punk'd") and on webisodes (The Romantic Foibles of Esteban). Stahl joined the cast of Glee with a recurring guest star role for its fourth season, starting in September 2012. Trisha Stahl has also worked as a commercial actress.

Filmography

References

External links
Official Website

1973 births
Living people
American actresses
Indiana University of Pennsylvania alumni
21st-century American women